Terrence Scott (born September 25, 1986 in Macon, Georgia) is a former professional Canadian football wide receiver. He most recently played for the BC Lions of the Canadian Football League. He was signed by the Lions as a street free agent in 2009. He played high school football for Central High School (Knoxville, Tennessee), and college football for the Oregon Ducks. Scott was released by the Lions on July 2, 2010.

References

External links
BC Lions bio
Rivals.com profile
Just Sports Stats

1986 births
Living people
American football wide receivers
American players of Canadian football
BC Lions players
Canadian football wide receivers
Oregon Ducks football players
Sportspeople from Macon, Georgia